The Zand tribe is a Laki-speaking Kurdish tribe mainly populating the countryside of Khanaqin in Iraq and in the provinces of Kurdistan and Hamadan of Iran.

History 
The Zand tribe is originally from the Khanaqin area and settled in Malayer near Hamadan. Incorporated into the army of Iranian ruler Nader Shah (1736-1747), they were moved to Khorasan. The Zands and other tribes of the Zagros Mountains managed to return home following Nader's assassination in 1747. Many returned to Lorestan according to M. Reza Hamzeh'ee, while Soane notes that parts of tribe ultimately returned to Khanaqin.

The tribe is most known for their member, Karim Khan Zand, who founded the Zand dynasty, ruling from 1751 till his death in 1779. His death was followed by internal conflicts for his succession which resulted in the weakening of the dynasty, ending with the defeat of Karim Khan's nephew Lotf Ali Khan by the Qajar ruler Agha Mohammad Khan Qajar (r. 1789-1797). 

The tribe was also known as one of the few where women fought alongside their husbands.

Origins 
According to Tucker, the Zands "were a branch of the Laks, a subgroup of the northern Lurs, who spoke Luri." Perry also states that the Zands "belonged to the Lakk group of Lurs". Frye, likewise, states that the Zand tribe "spoke the Lakk dialect of the Lur language". When Soane visited the tribe around 1918, the tribe denied any connection to Lurs.

References

Further reading 

 
 
 

Kurdish tribes